Monocarboxylate transporter 4 (MCT4) also known as solute carrier family 16 member 3 is a protein that in humans is encoded by the SLC16A3 gene.

Northern and western blotting and EST database analyses showed MCT4 to be widely expressed and especially so in glycolytic tissues such as white skeletal muscle fibers, astrocytes, white blood cells, chondrocytes, and some mammalian cell lines. Because of this, it has been proposed that the properties of MCT4 might be especially appropriate for export of lactate derived from glycolysis. MCT4 exhibits a lower affinity for most substrates and inhibitors than MCT1, with Km and Ki values some 5–10-fold higher. The high Km for pyruvate may be especially significant as this avoids loss of pyruvate from the cell which, were it to occur, would prevent removal of the reduced form of nicotinamide adenine dinucleotide (NADH) produced in glycolysis by reduction of pyruvate to lactate.

MCT4 can be upregulated by HIF-1α and AMPK.

See also 
Monocarboxylate transporter
Solute carrier family

References

Further reading 

 
 
 
 
 
 
 
 

Solute carrier family